Mourou is a surname. Notable people with the surname include:

 Abdelfattah Mourou, Tunisian lawyer and politician (Ennahda)
 Gérard Mourou, French physicist